The Nauvoo Neighbor was a weekly newspaper edited and published by Latter Day Saint apostle John Taylor in Nauvoo, Illinois, from 1843 to 1845. While it was not an official publication of the Church of Jesus Christ of Latter Day Saints, the Neighbor was consistently pro-Mormon and its primary target audience was the Latter Day Saint residents of Nauvoo. When The Wasp ceased publication in April 1843, the Neighbor replaced it as Nauvoo's premier secular newspaper.

The Neighbor reported on local, state, national, and international news and also commonly featured agricultural, commercial, scientific, and religious news as well as excerpts of literature. It, along with Times and Seasons, was the primary vehicle in which a Latter Day Saint perspective on the incarceration and death of Joseph Smith was transmitted to the public.

The first edition of the Nauvoo Neighbor was dated March 3, 1843. The final edition was published on October 29, 1845. Publication ceased when the majority of Latter Day Saints, including Taylor, decided to leave Nauvoo and emigrate to the Salt Lake Valley under the direction of Brigham Young.

See also

The Evening and the Morning Star
Messenger and Advocate
Elders' Journal
Millennial Star
List of Latter Day Saint periodicals

References
 Darwin L. Hays, "Nauvoo Neighbor" in Daniel H. Ludlow (ed.) (1992). Encyclopedia of Mormonism. (New York: Macmillan) p. 999.

External links
Nauvoo Neighbor (HTML) partial archive
Nauvoo Neighbor on Archive.org prepared by the Smith-Pettit Foundation and Signature Books
Nauvoo Neighbor (PDF scans) courtesy of the Book of Abraham Project

Defunct weekly newspapers
Church of Christ (Latter Day Saints) periodicals
Neighbor
Publications established in 1843
Publications disestablished in 1845
Latter Day Saint movement in Illinois
Defunct newspapers published in Illinois
1843 in Christianity
1843 establishments in Illinois